Steven K. Baum is a genocide scholar, gerontologist with an MA in psychopharmacology from New Mexico State University (2010). He has written several books including The Psychology of Genocide (Cambridge University Press 2008), Antisemitism Explained (UPA 2012), and with co-editors Florette Cohen and Steven L. Jacobs, Antisemitism in North America: New World, Old Hate (Brill). He founded with N. E. Rosenberg and is chief editor of the Journal for the Study of Antisemitism (JSA). Baum practices psychology in Albuquerque, New Mexico.

Controversy 
As chief editor of the Journal for the Study of Antisemitism, Baum became entangled in politics when the inaugural issue of the journal led to the temporary dismissal of board member Clemens Heni with several board members resigning for an article critical of ZfA—the Berlin Centre for Antisemitism Research. Heni was reinstated and several who resigned returned.

Books and journals 
 The Psychology of Genocide (Cambridge University Press 2008), 
 Antisemitism Explained (UPA 2012), 
 Antisemitism in North America (Brill, forthcoming)
 Chief editor, Journal for the Study of Antisemitism

References

External links 
 
 , 2010
 Steven K. Baum at Google Scholar

Living people
Scholars of antisemitism
21st-century American psychologists
1953 births
20th-century American psychologists